VSB-30 - "Veículo de Sondagem Booster – 30" (Booster Sounding Vehicle) or "Foguete Suborbital VSB-30" is the designation of a Brazilian sounding rocket, which replaced the Skylark rocket at Esrange.

The VSB-30 is based on the VS-30 rocket (S-30 engine) with the addition of a booster stage (S-31 engine). Development started in 2000 in cooperation with DLR.
The rocket can carry a payload of 400 kg to an altitude of 270 km. It has a liftoff thrust of 240 kN and a total mass of 2570 kg. It has a diameter of 0.57 m and a length of 12.6 m.

VSB-30 was first launched on October 23, 2004, at Alcântara Launch Center. The first launch at Esrange took place on December 1, 2005.

Flights
 VSB-30 XV-01 - "Cajuana test" - 2004 October 23  - Apogee: 240 km
 VSB-30 V02 -"TEXUS EML-1/TEXUS 42 Microgravity mission" - 2005 December 1 - Apogee: 263 km
 VSB-30 V03 -"TEXUS 43 Microgravity mission" - 2006 May 10 - Apogee: 237 km
 VSB-30 V04 -"Cuma II Microgravity mission" - 2007 July 19 - Apogee: 242 km 
 VSB-30 V05 -"DLR TEXUS 44 (EML-2)" - 2008 February 7  - Apogee: 264 km
 VSB-30 V06 -"DLR TEXUS 45" - 2008 February 21 - Apogee: 270 km
 VSB-30 V08 -"MASER 11" - 2008 May 15 - Apogee: 252 km
 VSB-30 V09 -"TEXUS 46" - 2009 November 22  
 VSB-30 V10 -"TEXUS 47" - 2009 November 29 
 VSB-30 V07 -"MICROG 1A" - 2010 December 12 - Apogee: 242 km
 VSB-30 V15 -"TEXUS 49" - 2011 March 29 - Apogee: 268 km
 VSB-30 V14 -"TEXUS 48" - 2011 March 29 - Apogee: 268 km
 VSB-30 V16 -"MASER 12" - 2012 February 13 - Apogee: 259 km
 VSB-30 V17 -"TEXUS 50" - 2013 April 12
 VSB-30 V20 -"CRYOFENIX" - 2015 February 22
 VSB-30 V13 -"HIFiRE 7" - 2015 March 30
 VSB-30 V18 -"TEXUS 51" - 2015 April 23
 VSB-30 V21 -"TEXUS 52" - 2015 April 27
 VSB-30 V24 -Mapheus 5 - 2015 July 30
 VSB-30 V22 -"MASER 13" - 2015 December 1
 VSB-30 V23 -"TEXUS 53" - 2016 January 23
 VSB-30  V11 - "MICROG 2" -  07.12.2016
 VSB-30  V19 - "MAIUS 1" - 23.01.2017
 VSB-30      - MAPHEUS 6 -  13.05.2017  
 VSB-30  V12 - "HIFiRE 4a / HIFiRE 4b" - 30.06.2017
 VSB-30      - "MASER-14" - 24.06.2019 - Apogee: 260 km
 VSB-30 - "TEXUS-56" - 15.11.2019 09:35 (UTC) - Apogee: 256 km
 VSB-30 14-X S - "Cruzeiro Operation" - 14 December 2021 - Apogee: 280 km
 VSB-30 - "TEXUS-57" - 01.10.2022 06:26 (UTC)
 VSB-30 V29 - "Operação Santa Branca" (MQ-PSM) - 23 October 2022 - Apogee: 227 km
 VSB-30 - "S1X-3/MASER 15" - 23 November 2022 - Apogee: 260 km

Sources:

Characteristics

Length (mm) 12600
Stages 2
Payload Mass (kg) 400
Diameter (mm) 570
Total takeoff mass (kg) 2570
Apogee (km) 270

Stages
S-30 solid rocket stage: 
Gross Mass 1,200 kg (2,646 lb)
Unfuelled mass: 341 kg (752 lb)
Height: 3.30 m (10.80 ft)
Diameter: 0.56 m (1.83 ft)
Thrust: 102.00 kN (22,930 lbf)
Burn time: 20 s

S-31 solid rocket stage. 
Gross Mass 900 kg (1,984 lb)
Unfuelled mass: 284 kg (626 lb)
Height: 3.20 m (10.40 ft)
Diameter: 0.56 m (1.83 ft)
Thrust: 240.00 kN (53,950 lbf)
Burn time: 11 s

See also

VS-30
VS-40
 List of rockets

References

External links
 History of Brazilian space launchers: VSB-30 
 Space Agency of Brazil: VSB-30 

Sounding rockets of Brazil
Space program of Brazil